Rawat is a surname of people belonging to Hindu Rajput from Garhwal and Kumaon divisions in the Indian state of Uttarakhand and Rajputs (Kshatriya caste) of Nepal.

Rajputs, people with Rawat surname are mainly concentrated in Uttarakhand, some number of them are found. in Nepal adjacent to Uttarakhand.

A few of them are also found in Rajasthan and around its neighbouring border of Madhya Pradesh, primarily in the Mandsaur and Neemuch districts.

Regional expansion

Western India 
Mainly a social community of Uttarakhand, where most of their population is concentrated.Also Known As Land King Of Uttarakhand.

The Rawat Rajput which has Mostly Population Lives In Uttrakhand.

Language 
In place of Rawat composition, Kumaoni and Garhwali languages were spoken.

Notable people 
 General Bipin Rawat (1958-2021), Indian military officer
 Chitrashi Rawat, actress
 Durga Bahadur Rawat, Nepalese politician 
 Harish Rawat, politician
 Harisingh Rawat, politician from Rajasthan
 Harish Chandra Singh Rawat, Indian 
 Jaswant Singh Rawat, Indian
Madhulika Rawat (1963–2021), Indian social worker
 Menuka Rawat, Nepalese runner
 Nain Singh Rawat, Indian mountaineer
Navaraj Rawat, Nepalese politician
 Navi Rawat, US actress
 Pradeep Rawat (politician), Indian politician
 Prem Rawat, speaker and teacher, formerly known as Guru Maharaj Ji
 Suresh Singh Rawat, politician from Rajasthan
 Shankar Singh Rawat, politician from Rajasthan
 Teelu Rauteli, 17th century warrior
 Pradeep Rawat (actor), Indian actor
 Prashant Singh Rawat, Indian basketball player

References 

Garhwali Rajputs
Kumaoni Rajputs
Rajput clans of Uttarakhand
Social groups of Uttarakhand
Rajputs
Khas surnames
Nepalese Hindus
Kshatriya communities